The Arabic name , romanized as AlSaudiah,  is the Internationalized country code top-level domain  for Saudi Arabia.

History 
The top-level domain was installed in the DNS on May 5, 2010. It was among the first non-Latin top-level domains to ever go live.

Government organizations were able to register the domain name for the first time from 31 May 2010 to 12 July 2010, followed by a public launch a few months later. By 2013, 1,939 AlSaudiah domain names were registered.

Description 
AlSaudiah is the Internationalized country code top-level domain for Saudi Arabia. Only persons or entities related to Saudi Arabia are able to register. The top-level domain is managed by the Saudi Network Information Center (SaudiNIC).

The ASCII name of this domain in the Domain Name System is xn--mgberp4a5d4ar, obtained by application of the Internationalizing Domain Names in Applications (IDNA) rules for the  translation of the Unicode representation of the script version.

Saudi Arabia is also assigned the country code top-level domain .sa.

See also 
 Saudi Network Information Center
 .sa

References 

السعودية
Internet in Saudi Arabia